Dave Waddington is a former powerlifter and  strongman from Ohio, United States. Apart from his three appearances at the World's Strongest Man finals, he is also famed as the first man to ever break the 1000 lb barrier in the squat.

Early life
Dave Waddington was born on May 10, 1952 in Sandusky, Ohio. He attended Sandusky High School.

Powerlifting career
Waddington competed in three World's Strongest Man contests, finishing third in the first one he entered in 1981 behind two of the most accomplished strength athletes, Bill Kazmaier and Geoff Capes.

As a powerlifter, Dave Waddington was briefly the super heavyweight IPF champion in 1980, but was later disqualified, the title passing to Doyle Kenady. The next year, on June 13, 1981 Waddington became the first man to squat over 1,000 lbs.

Powerlifting record
Dave Waddington was a seven time Ohio Champion, and a four time YMCA National Champion.

1977  
 - A.A.U. Senior National Championship 
 - Pan American Champion
1980
 - North American Champion
 - Hawaiian Open Champion
 - 7 YMCA National Records
 - 6 Ohio State Records
 - 2 North American Records
 - World squat record Super heavyweight class - 959 lbs and 970 lbs.
1981
 - 3rd place Strongest Man contest
 - First person to squat 1,003 lbs. in competition
 - U.S. Invitational
 - Listed in the Guinness Book of World Records
1982
 - American Squat Record, 909 lbs. in 275 lb class
 - American Total Record at 2,220 lbs.
 - 2nd place World's Strongest Man (set the world record in Caber Toss) 
1984
 - 3rd place Canada's Louis Cyr Strongest Man contest
 - 4th place Sweden's World's Strongest Man contest, Mora, Sweden
   (Set the world record in loglift at 507 lbs)

Personal life
Waddington was born on 5-10-1952 in Sandusky, Ohio . He is a lifelong resident of Sandusky, where he resides with his wife and son. He is a custodian with the Sandusky City Schools. He was elected Sandusky City Commissioner in 2003 and served two terms before being termed out in 2011.  He was re-elected city commissioner in 2015. Waddington is a community activist, avid golfer, and known "Cheesehead", a term sports writers and fans use to describe Green Bay Packers enthusiasts.

See also
 List of strongmen

References

External links
 Profile at Strongestman.billhenderson.org

American strength athletes
American sportsmen
American powerlifters
Sportspeople from Sandusky, Ohio
Living people
1952 births